James Cook Boys Technology High School is a boys' secondary school situated on Princes Highway in Kogarah, Australia. The school is named after Captain James Cook, the first recorded European contact with the eastern coastline of Australia.

History

James Cook was founded in 1956 after Moorefield racecourse was demolished. The site of the racecourse was divided to provide sites for three schools (Moorefield Girls High School, James Cook Boys Technology High School and St George school for kids with severe disabilities), St George TAFE. The rest of the site was allocated for residential development.

The school was renamed several times (originally Moorefield Boys High School) before becoming James Cook Boys. In 1990 the school faced a choice between becoming a sports or technology specialty secondary school, choosing to become a technology high school. The name was changed to James Cook Boys Technology High School in 1990.

Royal visit 
Queen Elizabeth II visited the school on 29 April 1970 (the bicentennial year of James Cook's arrival in Australia) along with her husband Prince Philip, Duke of Edinburgh and Anne, Princess Royal.

School statistics

2015

School staff

Student background 2015

Students 2015

VET in schools 2014

Senior secondary outcomes 2014

Sport
James Cook Boys has teams in a variety of sports, including:

Regular summer grade sports: cricket, basketball, baseball, squash, table tennis, touch football, volleyball, and mini soccer

Regular winter grade sports: baseball, rugby league, soccer, softball, table tennis, tennis, and Australian rules football

Regular non-grade activities: fitness, senior rec and action sports both including soccer, basketball, table tennis, tennis, volleyball, touch football and special school

Associated schools
Moorefield Girls High School is considered to be the female counterpart or 'sister school' of James Cook Boys Technology High School, and has in the past engaged in prefect activities to organise a joint multicultural day. 
In the past these two schools have conducted combined classes in senior years (Years 11 & 12), where students will go across to the other school to participate in classes. They have also worked together in Crossroads, a 25-hour personal development and health course for years 11–12 which was a compulsory part of the HSC.

Notable students 

 Hakan Ayik
Colin Bennett - Soccer Australia
 Greg Child - Rock Climbing
 Trevor Edwards - Anglican Archbishop for Canberra
 Mike Grbevski - Soccer Australia
 George Harris - Soccer Australia
 Neville Hayes - Swimmer Olympics
 Clyde Hefer - Rowing Olympics
 Gary Hughes - Surfing
 Steve Kamper - current NSW State Parliament Member for Rockdale
 Ivan Lee - Anglican Bishop
 Brad Mackay - Rugby League Player  St George & Australia
 David Niu - Rugby League and Union Player
 Robert Proctor - Hockey Australia
 Ron Riley - Hockey Australia
 Mark Schulman - Rugby League Player St George
 Brian Smith - Rugby League Coach 
 Geoff Smith - Decathlon Athlete Australia
 Leigh Warren - Australian Ballet

References 

Public high schools in Sydney
1956 establishments in Australia
Kogarah, New South Wales
Educational institutions established in 1956
School buildings completed in 1956